William Parker (September 17, 1886 – July 8, 1941) was an American screenwriter. He wrote the screenplay for more than thirty films from 1913 to 1921.

Selected filmography
The Cave Girl (1921)
The Virgin of Stamboul (1920)
The Jack-Knife Man (1920)
The Family Honor (1920)
Revenge (1918)
A Weaver of Dreams (1918)
 Hearts or Diamonds? (1918)
The Scarlet Car(1917)
 Money Madness (1917)
 The Winged Mystery (1917)
 Who Was the Other Man? (1917)
 The Mainspring (1916)

References

External links
 

1886 births
1941 deaths
People from Walla Walla, Washington
American male screenwriters
Screenwriters from Washington (state)
20th-century American male writers
20th-century American screenwriters